Elateroides is a genus of rarely found beetles in the family Lymexylidae, containing the following species:

 Elateroides dermestoides (Linnaeus, 1761)
 Elateroides flabellicornis (Schneider, 1791)
 Elateroides lugubris (Say, 1835)
 Elateroides nigrocephalus 
 Elateroides reitteri 
 Elateroides stoeckleini

References

Lymexylidae
Cucujoidea genera